Tricholosporum subporphyrophyllum is a species of fungus in the family Tricholomataceae. Found in Mexico, the species was described as new to science in 1975 by Mexican mycologist Gaston Guzman.

References

External links

subporphyrophyllum
Fungi of North America
Fungi described in 1975